(María) Saleta Castro Nogueira (born 3 November 1987, Pontevedra, Spain), is a Spanish, Galician, professional triathlete, National U23 Triathlon (Olympic Distance) and National Elite Long Distance Champion of the year 2010.

In 2003, at the age of 15, she took part in her first ITU competition and placed fifth at the European Youth Team Championships in Győr (20 July 2003).

In 2009 Saleta Castro was number 1 in the Spanish Elite ranking although she had taken part in only three of the ten circuit events. At the Galician U23 Championships she placed second and at the Elite Championships she placed third .

In 2010 Saleta Castro was number 3 in the Spanish Elite ranking and won the gold medal at the Galician Elite Championships.

In 2011, Saleta Castro will probably concentrate on Long Distance triathlons since her name is listed among the Spanish Long Distance elite triathletes (DAR = Deportistas Alto Rendimiento 2011).

Saleta Castro represents the Galician club Cidade de Lugo Fluvial. She trains in CGTD with other Spanish triathletes like Aida Valiño, Oscar Vicente, Jesus Gomar.

ITU Competitions 
The list is based upon the official ITU rankings and the Athlete's Profile Page. Unless indicated otherwise, all events are triathlons (Olympic Distance) and belong to the Elite Category.

BG = the sponsor British Gas · DNF = did not finish · DNS = did not start

External links 
 Spanish Triathlon federation in Spanish
 Galician Triathlon Federation in Galician (Gallego)
 Castro's triathlon club Cidade Lugo Fluvial in Galician (Gallego) and in Spanish

Notes 

Spanish female triathletes
1987 births
Living people
21st-century Spanish women